Sakhtman Taher (also Romanized as Sākhtmān Ţāher) is a village in Dehrud Rural District, Eram District, Dashtestan County, Bushehr Province, Iran. At the 2006 census, its population was 39, in 9 families.

References 

Populated places in Dashtestan County